The 1941 Hornsey by-election was held on 28 May 1941.  The by-election was held due to the death of the incumbent Conservative MP, Euan Wallace.  It was won by the Conservative candidate David Gammans.

References

Hornsey by-election
Hornsey,1941
Hornsey by-election
Political history of Middlesex
Hornsey,1941
20th century in Middlesex
Hornsey